Wait for Your Laugh is a 2017 documentary film on the career of Rose Marie. The film was directed by Jason Wise and featured notable celebrities including Dick Van Dyke, Peter Marshall, and Carl Reiner.

The film premiered at the 2017 Mill Valley Film Festival, and was well received.

Synopsis 
Rose Marie's career spanned ninety years, starting at the age of four with a radio show and transitioning through vaudeville, Broadway, Vegas, movies and television. Interviews with Rose Marie as well as her costars Dick Van Dyke, Peter Marshall, Carl Reiner, and Tim Conway are interlaced with behind-the-scenes footage from shows and sets, including The Dick Van Dyke Show, and personal home movies from the iconic actress.

Reviews 
On review aggregate website Rotten Tomatoes, the film holds an approval rating of 89%, based on 19 critical reviews with a weighted average score of 7.43/10. Harvey Dennis  with Variety saying, "As lively and likable as its subject, Jason Wise’s documentary 'Wait for Your Laugh' pays fond tribute to a tireless trooper whom generations have known mostly as a wisecracking second banana often funnier than the bigger stars she supported." The Hollywood Reporter called it, "A loving doc that will open the eyes of youngsters who know her only from The Dick Van Dyke Show if they know her at all."

References

External links 
 
 
 

2017 documentary films
Biographical documentary films
2017 films